Velvet Noise Extended is re-release of Danish band Raunchy's debut album, released in 2001.

Track listing
 "Twelve Feet Tall"
 "Bleeding"
 "Drive"
 "Tonight"
 "Leech"
 "My Game"
 "Crack of Dawn"
 "Out of Sight"
 "This Is Not an Exit"
 "Never Be" (bonus track) (taken from the 3 demo)
 "Decemberklar" (bonus track) (taken from the Christmas single)
 "Last Christmas" (Wham! cover) (bonus track)
 "From Out of Nowhere" (Faith No More cover) (bonus track)

2007 albums